Sant Vicenç dels Horts is a municipality in the Province of Barcelona in Catalonia, Spain. It is situated on the right bank of the Llobregat river, on the N-340 road from Molins de Rei to Vilafranca del Penedès. The main rail lines of the Llobregat corridor pass through the town: the station is served by the FGC services S4, S7, S8, S33, R5 and R6. The remains of an Iberic village are visible at Puig Castellar.

The GR 92 long distance footpath, which roughly follows the length of the Mediterranean coast of Spain, has a staging point at Sant Vicenç dels Horts.

Demography

References

 Panareda Clopés, Josep Maria; Rios Calvet, Jaume; Rabella Vives, Josep Maria (1989). Guia de Catalunya, Barcelona: Caixa de Catalunya.  (Spanish).  (Catalan).

External links
 Government data pages 

Municipalities in Baix Llobregat